Misty Roses was an LP album featuring The Sandpipers, released by A&M Records in 1967. The album reached #135 on the Billboard chart and the first track, "Cuando Salí de Cuba," made #3 on the Billboard Adult Contemporary chart.

The December 23, 1967 issue of Billboard Magazine reviewed the album:
The Sandpipers have established themselves as good album sellers and this new entry should sustain their sales pace. The title song is a winner and will draw plays, as will the rest of the solid repertoire.

Catalog numbers were LP-135/SP-4135 in the U.S. and Canada, and AMLS912 in the U.K.  Other international releases included Australia (Mayfair SMF66-9924), Austria (A&M 212 026), Brazil (Fermata FB-207), Columbia (Fermata LPF 24-46), Germany (A&M 212 026), South Africa (A&M LAM 2032), Spain (A&M/Hispavox HDAS 371-14), and Taiwan (First S-FL-1575, orange vinyl, and Bell SWL-1137, red vinyl).  The album was reissued in 1974 on the U.K. Mayfair label.

Track listing 

Side One
 "Cuando Salí de Cuba" (Luis Aguilé) 2:39
 "And I Love Her" (John Lennon/Paul McCartney) 2:19
 "Fly Me to the Moon (In Other Words)" (Bart Howard) 1:51
 "Strange Song" (Chip Taylor) 2:43
 "The Honeywind Blows" (Fred Hellerman/Fran Minkoff) 2:30

Side Two
 "Misty Roses" (Tim Hardin) 3:27
 "Today" (Randy Sparks) 2:25
 "I Believed It All" (Al Hirt/Alan Bergman/Marilyn Bergman) 2:49
 "Daydream" (John Sebastian) 2:15
 "Wooden Heart"  (Fred Wise/Ben Weisman/Kay Twomey/Bert Kaempfert) 2:11

Production 
Producer: Tommy LiPuma
Arrangers: Perry Botkin, Jr., Nick DeCaro
Engineers: Henry Lewy, Bruce Botnick
Album Design: Corporate Head
Art Director: Tom Wilkes
Photography: Guy Webster
Back Cover: Peter Whorf

Reissue 
The album was combined with The Wonder of You in a 2006 CD release by Collectors' Choice Music.

References 

The Sandpipers albums
1967 albums
Albums produced by Tommy LiPuma
A&M Records albums